Teignbridge is a local government district in Devon, England.  Its council is based in Newton Abbot.

Other towns in the district include Ashburton, Buckfastleigh, Dawlish and Teignmouth.  It is named for the old Teignbridge hundred.

The district was formed on 1 April 1974, under the Local Government Act 1972, as a merger of the Ashburton, Buckfastleigh, Dawlish, Newton Abbot and Teignmouth urban districts along with Newton Abbot Rural District and part of St Thomas Rural District.

Politics

Elections to the borough council are held every four years, with all of the 46 seats on the council being elected at each election. The council had been under no overall control since the 1983, until the Conservatives gained a majority in the 2011 elections. After the 2019 local elections, the Liberal Democrats won control of the council. The political composition of the borough has been as follows:

Settlements
Teignbridge contains the following towns and villages:

References

 
Non-metropolitan districts of Devon